Moenjo Daro Airport  is a domestic airport located at Mohenjo-daro, Sindh under the administration of Pakistan Civil Aviation Authority. It is 28 km away from the city of Larkana.

Formerly, it was the third busiest airport in Sindh.

History 
It was founded in 1967 during the tenure of Ayub Khan. The airport was upgraded in 1973.

In 1996, its runway and terminal buildings were extended.

See also 
 List of airports in Pakistan

References

External links 

Airports in Sindh
Larkana District
1967 establishments in Pakistan
Airports established in 1967